Robert Moses Playground is a  playground and park in Manhattan, New York City. It is located in the Murray Hill neighborhood on First Avenue between 41st and 42nd streets, immediately south of the headquarters of the United Nations. The park is named for New York's "master builder" Robert Moses, then the head of the Triborough Bridge and Tunnel Authority, which constructed the playground as part of the construction of the Queens–Midtown Tunnel.

History
The land for the park was obtained in 1937 as part of the Queens-Midtown Tunnel construction in exchange for the taking of a portion of St. Gabriel's Park (now named St. Vartan Park) for an approach roadway. The Park itself was completed in 1941 and shares the block with the large ventilation building for the tunnel. It was named for Moses in 1982.

The park's asphalt playground was often used for roller hockey, and the East End Hockey Association had been organizing games at the site since 1972. The asphalt playground was replaced by a synthetic turf field in July 2021 to improve existing parks due to the temporary loss of park space during construction of the city's East Side Coastal Resiliency project.

Land reclamation
Since 1982, there have been at least three attempts to take the park's land for building projects.

The most recent proposal was raised by the United Nations in June 2010. Under this deal, the city would then expand the nearby East River Greenway to compensate for the loss of this park. On December 8, 2010, Manhattan Community Board 6 gave their support to this plan, providing that the esplanade was expanded. In March 2011, the city gave approval to move ahead with a feasibility study for this project as part of Mayor Bloomberg's Vision 2020: New York City Comprehensive Waterfront Plan.

The UN would pay the city at least $65 million for the park. The plan is opposed by some residents of Tudor City, which is across the street from the park.

On October 5, 2011, the city and state reached an agreement to use the western portion of Robert Moses Playground for an expansion of the United Nations campus.  In exchange, the United Nations Development Corporation would pay $73 million to fund the development of the East River esplanade between 38th and 60th streets. To make up for the loss of parkland, the City will convert Asser Levy Place into parkland.

References

Parks in Manhattan
Murray Hill, Manhattan
Headquarters of the United Nations
1941 establishments in New York City